Laurence Olivier (1907–1989) was an English actor who, along with his contemporaries Ralph Richardson and John Gielgud, dominated the British stage of the mid-20th century. He also worked in films throughout his career, playing more than fifty cinema roles. From 1935 he performed in radio broadcasts and, from 1956, had considerable success in television roles.

After attending drama school, Olivier began his professional career with small touring companies before being taken on in 1925 by Sybil Thorndike and her husband, Lewis Casson, as a bit-part player, understudy and assistant stage manager for their London company. In 1926 he joined the Birmingham Repertory Company, where he was given the chance to play a wide range of key roles. In 1930 he had his first important West End success in Noël Coward's Private Lives, and in 1935 he played in a celebrated production of Romeo and Juliet alongside Gielgud and Peggy Ashcroft, and by the end of the decade he was an established star. In the 1940s, together with Richardson and John Burrell, Olivier was the co-director of the Old Vic, building it into a highly respected company. There his most celebrated roles included Shakespeare's Richard III and Sophocles's Oedipus. In the 1950s Olivier was an independent actor-manager, but his stage career was in the doldrums until he joined the avant garde English Stage Company in 1957 to play the title role in The Entertainer. From 1963 to 1973 he was the founding director of Britain's National Theatre, running a resident company that fostered many future stars. His own parts there included the title role in Othello (1964) and Shylock in The Merchant of Venice (1970).

In 1930, to gain money for his forthcoming marriage, Olivier began his film career with small roles in two films. In 1939 he appeared as Heathcliff in Wuthering Heights in a role that saw him nominated for the Academy Award for Best Actor. The following year he was again nominated for the same award for his portrayal of Maxim de Winter in Rebecca. In 1944 he produced, directed and appeared as Henry V of England in Henry V. There were Oscar nominations for the film, including Best Picture and Best Actor, but it won none and the film instead won a "Special Award". He won the Best Actor award for the 1948 film Hamlet, which became the first non-American film to win the Academy Award for Best Picture. He later received Oscar nominations for roles in Richard III (1955), The Entertainer (1960), Othello (1965), Sleuth (1972), Marathon Man (1976) and The Boys from Brazil (1978). In 1979 he was also presented with an Honorary Award, at the Academy Awards, to recognise his lifetime of contribution to the art of film. He was nominated for nine other acting Oscars and one each for production and direction. Throughout his career Olivier appeared in radio dramas and poetry readings, and made his television debut in 1956.

After being ill for the last twenty-two years of his life, Olivier died of kidney failure on 11 July 1989. In reflection, and about Olivier's pioneering of Britain's National Theatre, the broadcaster Melvyn Bragg wrote: "[N]o one doubts that the National is perhaps his most enduring monument". Olivier's claim to theatrical greatness lay not only in his acting, but as, in the words of the English theatre director Peter Hall, "the supreme man of the theatre of our time".

Theatre

As actor

This table contains Olivier's known professional theatrical roles. It also contains the occasions when he both acted and directed. It does not contain those productions where he was a director but did not appear on stage. It also omits the amateur productions in which he performed at school, mostly Shakespeare, playing, among other roles, Brutus, Puck and also female roles, including Katherina in The Taming of the Shrew.

As director
This table contains Olivier's stage work as a director. It does not include the 15 productions in which he also appeared, which are shown in the table above.

Filmography

Selected radio broadcasts 

All the productions shown were for BBC radio.

Television

See also
 List of awards and nominations received by Laurence Olivier

Notes and references

Notes

References

Sources

 
  
 
 
 
 
 
 
 
 
 
 

On stage and screen
Male actor filmographies
British filmographies